Black Lakes is a pair of lakes that are part of a small endorheic basin in Kenora District, Ontario, Canada, about  southwest of the community of Vermilion Bay. The eastern lake flows via an unnamed creek into Walleye Lake, which has no outlet.

See also
List of lakes in Ontario

References

Lakes of Kenora District